The Harehills riot took place in the multi-ethnic Leeds district of Harehills (West Yorkshire, England) in 2001.  The riot occurred after the alleged wrongful arrest of an Asian man by the West Yorkshire Police which was alleged to have been heavy-handed. More than 100 Asian, White, and Black youths were together involved in the six-hour-long rioting against the police. The West Yorkshire Police later stated that any attempt to legitimise criminal behaviour by saying it is connected with racial tension or the style of policing is just an excuse for young males committing crime on the streets. It was the first rioting in Leeds since the Hyde Park riots of 1995.  The Police Officer involved in the alleged wrongful arrest was questioned, and later cleared of any wrongdoing.

Wrongful arrest allegations
The wrongful arrest allegations involved Hossein Miah, who was arrested over a suspicious tax disc. Miah alleged that the arresting officer pulled him from his vehicle causing him injury.  The Police Complaints Authority cleared the officer of any charges relating to the incident, but expressed regret for "any distress which has been caused to either Mr Miah or his family."

Start of rioting

Sporadic unrest had already begun in the area when a hoax 999 call was made at 20:25 saying a police officer had been hit by a petrol bomb.  The police could not locate this, however the call lured them into Banstead Park, where they were met by a barricade of burning washing machines and furniture, looted from a nearby second hand shop.  It was in Banstead Park where most of the confrontation took place, although the disturbances spread onto Roundhay Road, Roseville Road and smaller residential streets towards the south side of Harehills.  By the time darkness had fallen the rioting had begun, and continued into the early hours of the following morning.

End of rioting
After over 200 participants spent over seven hours rioting, the police managed to make enough arrests to quell the size of the crowd to a point where it dispersed and the police could regain control.

Damage

Over the course of the rioting 26 cars were burnt out, two police officers and two journalists were severely injured, and a shop was set alight.  Both police officers and members of the public were pelted with bottles and bricks.

Aftermath
Many arrests took place following the rioting, local shops were advised only to secure their premises and not to reglaze, as the police feared more rioting would take place, however the riot seemed to be an isolated incident and the violence did not continue beyond 6 June 2001.

Sentencing
On 7 March 2002, nine months after the riots, 25 men were imprisoned after being found guilty of their involvement in the riot.

See also
 Chapeltown riot (1975)
 Chapeltown riot (1981)
 Chapeltown riot (1987)

References

2001 in England
2001 riots
2000s in Leeds
Crime in Leeds
Harehills
June 2001 crimes
June 2001 events in the United Kingdom
Race riots in England
Riots and civil disorder in England